Flight 605 may refer to:

Eastern Air Lines Flight 605, crashed on 30 May 1947
Indian Airlines Flight 605, crashed on 14 February 1990
China Airlines Flight 605, crashed on 4 November 1993

0605